This is the timeline for Southern Railway zone that encompasses over present day Tamil Nadu, Kerala and parts of Andhra Pradesh and Karnataka.

Timeline

19th century 

 1845 Madras Railway Company was launched.
 1853 Madras Railway Company, registered in Chennai (Royapuram) began work.
 1856 First passenger rail service began in Royapuram - Walajapet (Walaja Road) route. Perambur loco workshop set up in Vaughan.
 1857: Walajapet(Walaja Road) - Cuddalore route was proposed via: Katpadi, Tiruvannamalai, Tirukoilur.
 05.04.1859 Construction of Railway System started at Negapatam to lay BG track to Tanjore by the Great Southern of India Railway Company (G.S.I.R).
 1861: Tirur - Chaliyam (Kozhikode) route commissioned . Great Southern Railway of India Tiruchirappalli - Nagapattinam (broad gauge) up to 125 km from the gauge set. Walaja road - Cuddalore route came to existence via: Tiruvannamalai, Viluppuram. 
 01.05.1861 BG section from Kuttipuram to Tirur opened
 18.07.1861 Old Coimbatore Now Podanur Station Building was Completed
 02.12.1861 First BG train from Negapatam to Tanjore inaugurated.
 11.3.1862 Track extended to Trichinopoly' from Tanjore and further extended to 'Trichinopoly Fort' (BG section)
 1862: Madras Railway Company's Tram way for local transport established in Chennai.
 1864: Jolarpettai - Bengaluru mail began service.
 14.04.1862 BG section from Podanur to Pattambi opened
 12.05.1862 BG section from Sankaridurg to Podanur opened
 01.02.1864 First Express Train of South India "Blue Mountain Express" From Old Coimbatore (#Podanur) To Chennai Royapuram Started 
 1865: GSIR's General Office building constructed at Trichinopoly
 08.05.1865 BG section from Conjeevaram to Arkonam opened.
 03.12.1866  BG section opened between Trichinopoly Fort and Karur.
 01.07.1867 BG section opened between Karur and Kodumudi
 01.01.1868 BG section opened between Kodumudi and Erode.
 1868: Service began in Nagapattinam - Tiruchirappalli.
 01.02.1873 BG section from Podanur to Coimbatore Junction opened. Opening of Coimbatore Railway Station. 
 01.02.1873 BG section opened from Vellalore Road to Nanjundapuram Coimbatore Junction.
 07.04.1873 Partial Opening of Madras Central (Now Puratchi Thalaivar Dr. M.G. Ramachandran Chennai Central Railway Station)
 31.08.1873 BG section from Coimbatore Jn. to Mettupalayam opened Opening of Mettupalayam Railway Station. 
 01.07.1874 The South Indian Railway Company (SIR) formed by amalgamating the Great Southern of India Railway Co. and the Carnatic Railway Co.
 26.01.1875 Nidamangalam to Tiruvarur section converted from BG to MG.
 19.06.1875 Tiruvarur to Negapattanam section converted from BG to MG.
 03.07.1875 Tanjore to Nidamangalam section converted from BG to MG.
 10.07.1875 Track between Tanjore to Budalore converted from BG to MG.
 17.07.1875 Track between Budalore to Trichinopoly Junction converted from BG to MG.
 01.09.1875  MG section opened from Trichinopoly Junction to Madura. 
 01.01.1876 MG section opened from Madura to Tuticorin.
 01.01.1876 MG section opened from Maniyachi to Tinnevelly.
 01.09.1876 MG section from Madras Park to Tindivanam opened.
 01.01.1877 MG section from Tindivanam to Cuddalore Junction opened.
 15.02.1877 MG section from Mayavaram to Tanjore opened
 01.07.1877 MG section from Cuddalore Jn. to Porto Novo opened.
 01.07.1877 MG section from Shiyali to Mayavaram opened
 01.01.1878 MG section from Coleroon to Shiyali opened.
 14.07.1878 Conjeevaram to Arkonam section converted from BG to MG.
 21.08.1878 G.O.No. 810 issued for the transfer of Railway HQ from Negapatam to Trichinopoly.
 01.10.1878 MG section from Porto Novo to Chidambaram opened.
 01.01.1879 MG section from Madras Beach old to Park opened.
 01.07.1879 MG section from Chidambaram to Coleroon opened.
 01.07.1879 Track between Trichinopoly to Karur Converted from BG to MG.
 15.12.1879 MG section from Villupuram to the Gingee river inclusive of the bridge over the river opened
 15.12.1879 MG section from East bank of the Gingee river to Pondicheri opened.
 16.12.1879 Track between Karur to Erode Converted from BG to MG.
 1879: Metre gauge line between Puducherry and Viluppuram formed according to an agreement between French Government and the British Government.
 1880 Agent's Office shifted from Negapatam to Trichinopply.
 01.08.1880 MG section from Chingleput to Walajabad opened.
 01.01.1881 MG section from Walajabad to Conjeeveram opened.
 30.09.1885 Original Nilgiri Mountain Railway Company registered.
 1886 Engineering workshop opened at Trichinopoly.
 1886 Some portion of workshop activities transferred from Negapatam to Trichinopoly
 02.01.1888 BG section from Kadallundi to Calicut opened
 02.01.1888 BG section opened from Olavakkot to Palghat.
 1890 The "South Indian Railway" company which was incorporated in England came into being at Trichinopoly
 17.11.1890 MG section from Villupuram to Tiruvannamalai opened.
 18.03.1891 MG section from Tiruvannamalai to the outer signal of Katpadi opened.
 April 1894 Original Nilgiri Mountain Railway Company Liquidated.
 1891: Nilgiri Mountain Railway Company was commissioned.
 02.04.1894 MG section opened from Mayavaram Junction to Mutupet.
 Feb. 1896 New Nilgiri Mountain Railway Company formed.
 1898: Metre gauge line between Karaikal and Peralam formed according to an agreement between French Government and the British Government.
 1899: Mettupalayam (Coimbatore) - Coonoor service of Nilgiri mountain railway began. Olavakkode - Palakkad line constructed.
 1899: Chennai - Vijayawada passenger service began. Boat Mail from Chennai to Ceylon, with passenger ship with a connecting service between Dhanushkodi (Rameswaram) and Ceylon started.
 14.03.1899 Mettupalayam - Coonoor MG section opened for traffic.
 07.08.1899 MG section opened from Tuticorin to Foreshore.
 01.12.1899 MG section from Negapatam to Nagore opened.
 15.01.1900 MG line from Madras Beach Junction to Madras Beach opened.

20th century 

 01.10.1901 BG section from Calicut to Badagara opened.
 01.01.5.1902 BG section from Badagara to Tellicherry opened.
 01. 01.6.1902 MG section from Tinnevelly to Kallidaikurichi opened.
 16.7.1902 Ernakulam - Shoranur path was set up.
 1902: Kollam–Sengottai branch line was constructed to link port cities of Madras and Quilon together.
 01.08.1902 MG section between Manamadurai Jn. to Mandapam opened.
 01.08.1902 MG section opened from Madura to Manamadura.
 20.10.1902 MG section opened from Mutupet to Pattukottai.
 20.05.1903 BG section from Tellicherry to Cannanore opened.
 01.08.1903 MG section opened from Kallidaikurici to Shencottah.
 31.12.1903 MG section opened from Pattukottai to Arantangi.
 15.03.1904 BG section from Cannanore to Azhikkal opened.
 01.06.1904 MG section opened from Punalur to Quilon.
 26.11.1904: Passenger train service started on Quilon-Madras railway line.
 18.09.1905 NG (2 '6") section opened from Tiruppattur to Krishnagiri.
 18.01.1906 NG (2' 6") section opened from Morappur to Dharmapuri.
 21.08.1906 BG section from Azhikkal to Kanhangad opened.
 01.09.1906 MG section opened from Pamban to Rameswaram
 01.10.1906 BG section from Kanhangad to Kasaragod opened.
 17.11.1906 BG section from Kasaragod to Kumbla opened.
 21.01.1907 Feasibility Survey Report for India - Ceylon Railway was submitted by South Indian Railway Company.
 03.07.1907 BG section from Kumbla to Mangalore opened.
 1908:  was built.
 01.01.1908 Sections of Madras Railway Company transferred to South Indian Railway.
 15.09.1908 MG section opened from Coonoor to Fernhill.
 15.10.1908 MG section opened from Fernhill to Ootacamund.
 10.12.1908 MG section opened from Rameswaram Road to Dhaneshkodi Jetty.
 15.05.1913 NG (2'6") section opened from Dharmapuri to Hosur.
 Dec. 1913 Scherzer Rolling Bridge constructed at Pamban viaduct.
 01.01.1914 MG section opened from Mandapam to Pamban
 01.12.1914 MG section opened from Dhanushkodi Jetty to Dhanushkoai point.
 15.02.1915 MG section opened from Nidamangalam to Mannargudi.
 15.10.1915 MG section opened from Podanur to Pollachi.
 01.01.1917 BG section opened from Salem Junction to Salem Market and Salem Market to Salem Town
 01.01.1918 MG section opened from Quilon to Chakai.
 15.05.1919  MG section opened from Tituthuraipundi to Agastiyampalli.
 May 1921 Traffic control by telephone commenced between Madras Egmore -Villupuram - Tanjore main line section inaugurated.
 24.02.1923 MG section opened from Tinnevelly to Tiruchendur.
 1923 A 2'-0" gauge tramway line was opened from Golden Rock to Sircarpalayam to a distance of 2.827 miles for carrying materials and trolley movement of the Inspecting Officials of the Railway.
 1925 Water Storage Plant constructed at Sircarpalayam (near Trichinopoly).
 25.11.1926 MG section opened from Mayavaram to Tranquebar
 03.02.1927 BG section opened from Shoranur to Angadipuram
 01.03.1927 'Publicity Branch' inaugurated under a whole time officer for publicity of all branches including railway Time Table.
 30.06.1927 MG section opened from Virudunagar to Tenkasi
 03.08.1927 BG section opened from Angadipuram to Vaniyambalam
 22.08.1927 MG section opened from Srirangam to Golden Rock.
 15.10.1927 MG section opened from Pamban to Rameswaram Road.
 26.10.1927 BG section opened from Vaniyambalam to Nilambur Road.
 01.12.1927 MG section opened from Villupuram to Vriddhachalam.
 12.12.1927 MG section opened from Bikshandarkoil to Srirangam.
 16.01.1928 Central Workshop at Golden Rock established.
 10.03.1928 MG section opened from Lalgudi to Bikshandarkoil.
 21.06.1928 MG section opened from Cuddalore Junction to Vriddhachalam.
 1928 MG shop floor except Stores Department closed at Negapatam.
 1928 BG shop floor at Podanur closed
 19.11.1928 MG section opened from Dindigul to Pollachi.
 20.11.1928 MG section opened from Madura to Bodinayakanur.
 01.02.1929 MG section opened from Vriddhachalam to Lalgudi.
 15.04.1929 BG section from Salem to Mettur Dam branch including the mileage of assisting siding from Mecheri Road to Mettur Dam opened.
 17.04.1929 MG section opened between Trichinopoly Junction to Pudukottai.
 25.09.1929 Track between Erode to Trichinopoly converted from MG to BG in a record time of 5 hours
 1929: Chennai suburban railway service began.
 01.07.1930 MG section opened between Pudukottai to Manamadurai Jn.
 1930 Trichinopoly Marshalling Yard commissioned.
 03.02.1931 Salem Junction to Salem Market section and Salem Market to Salem Town section converted into mixed gauge of BG and MG.
 03.02.1931 MG section opened from Salem Town to Chinnasalem.
 01.04.1931 Through goods line from Cammerford Block Station to Broad Gauge Buffer end in Trichinopoly Goods Station opened.
 01.04.1931  Through goods line between Trichinopoly Junction and Golden Rock via classification yard opened
 02.04.1931 MG Electrified suburban service from Madras Beach to Tambaram inaugurated
 20.04.1931 Traffic Training School started at Trichinopoly to train probationers and signallers of Traffic department
 11.05.1931 First electric train for public service from Madras Beach to Tambaram started.
 17.08.1931 MG section opened from Chinnasalem Junction to Vriddhachalam.        
 04.11.1931 MG section opened from Chakai to Trivandrum Central.
 21.11.1931 Dry dock at Mandapam for docking the SIR Steamers completed and T.S.Irwin was first docked at Mandapam  
 01.04.1932 BG Section between Olavakkot to Palghat converted into mixed gauge.  
 01.04.1932 MG section opened from Pollachi to Palghat.
 1934: Ernakulam - Shoranur gauge conversion.
 1935 Trichinopoly Passenger Station remodelled with six additional platforms, two subways and two Road-over-bridges.           
 20.01.1936 MG section opened from Agastiyampalli to Point Calimere.
 01.07.1940 Idappalli-Ernakulam extension opened for BG good traffic.              
 01.07.1940 BG section between from Bridge Head to Cochin Pier to a distance of 4.07 miles opened.
 10.07.1941 MG section opened from Nanjundapuram Block Station to Coimbatore Jn.
 31.07.1941 NG (2' 6") section from Dharmapuri to Hosur closed for traffic.
 31.07.1941 NG (2' 6") section from Tiruppattur to Krishnagiri closed for traffic, 
 31.10.1941 NG (2' 6") section from Morappur to Dharmapuri closed for traffic.       
 12.11.1941 Short link (0.50 miles)near Shoranur to connect main line with Shoranur - Cochin Railway opened     
 01.04.1944 Contract with SIR Co. and M & S.M. Co. terminated and working of the railways taken over by Government of India
 01.04.1950 Mysore State Railway Co. came under the direct control of Govt, of India
 14.04.1951 Southern Railway formed integrating Madras & Southern Mahratta Railway Company, the South Indian Railway Company and theM ysore State Railway Company
 1951: Madras and Southern Mahratta Railway, the South Indian Railway Company, and the Mysore State Railway were united to form a new zone of the Southern Railway.
 24-12-1952 Ernakulam - Kollam MG line - turning of first sod by Shri Jawaharlal Nehru, Prime Minister of India.
 16-05-1956 Formation of Divisions in Southern Railway
 23-08-1957 Opening of Renigunta - Gudur broad gauge section
 1957 The  Railway  Press at Royapuram was expanded during 1957.
 00-01-1958 Opening of Ernakulam - Quilon metre gauge line
 00-00-1958 Establishment of S & T workshop Podanur
 01-09-1963 opening of Virudhunagar - Aruppukkottai metre gauge line
 02-05-1964 opening of Aruppukkottai -Manamadurai metre gauge line
 00-01-1965 Conversion of DC 1.5 kV electrified system to 25 kV AC system from Chennai Beach to Tambaram
 02-10-1966 Creation of South-Central Railway and handing over of Bezwada, Guntakal and Hubli Divisions to SC Railway
 23-11-1975 Broad gauge conversion of Ernakulam - Kollam MG section
 13-09-1976 Inauguration of  - Ernakulam BG section via Kottayam
 00-00-1976 Tamil Nadu Express from New Delhi - Chennai Central started its operation.
 15-07-1977 Inaugural run of Vaigai Express.
 13-04-1979 Electrification of Chennai - Gummidipundi section
 20-05-1979 Inauguration of Mangaluru - Hassan MG line
 09-08-1979 Electrification of Chennai Beach - Korukkupet - Madras Central
 02-10-1979 Creation of  Division
 29-11-1979 Electrification Chennai - Tiruvallur section
 27-07-1981 Creation of Bengaluru Division
 03-09-1982 Electrification of Tiruvallur - Arakkonam section
 11-08-1984 Electrified train services Between Chennai - Katpadi
 00-00-1984 Vaigai Express was bifurcated into Vaigai and Pallavan Express.
 00-00-1985 Phasing out BG Steam locomotives
 14-04-1987 Inauguration of EMU service Chennai - Avadi
 25-07-1987 First solid state interlocking in Indian Railways at Srirangam Station
 02-10-1987 Introduction of Computerised Passenger Reservation
 06-08-1988 Inauguration of Karur - Dindigul BG line
 15-10-1989 Opening of Ernakulam – Alappuzha BG line
 16-09-1991 Inauguration of MRTS project between Madras Beach - Park Town
 01-11-1992 Introduction of first Rajdhani Express in Southern Railway between Bengaluru - Nizamuddin
 20-11-1992 Inauguration of Alappuzha - Kayamkulam BG line
 00-03-1992 Electrification of Jolarpettai - Bangalore section
 16-04-1993 Opening of Bengaluru - Mysuru BG line
 21-10-1993 Inauguration of Karur - Dindigul - Madurai - Thoothukudi BG project
 09-05-1994 Introduction of first Shatabdi Express between Chennai – Mysuru
 31-08-1994 Inauguration of Chikjajur - Chitradurga - Rayadurg BG line
 02-04-1995 Inauguration of Chennai Beach-Tambaram BG line
 11-01-1997 Opening of Salem - Bengaluru BG line
 19-10-1997 Inauguration of MRTS project between Madras Beach - Thirumayilai
 22-08-1998 Inauguration of Tambaram - Tiruchirappalli (chord line) and Tiruchirapalli - Thanjavur opened after gauge conversion.
 06-01-1999 Opening of Tiruchirappalli - Dindigul BG line
 15-06-1999 Centenary Celebrations of Nilgiri Mountain Railway

21st century 
 23-07-2000 Inauguration of Electric traction between Thrissur-Ernakulam
 13-10-2000 Opening of 100th Computerised Passenger Reservation Centre at Kovilpatti
 30-10-2000 Commissioning of optical fibre communication link between Villupuram-Tiruchirapalli
 22-11-2000 Inauguration of new BG line between Penukonda and Puttaparthi
 2002: Southern Railway, Bengaluru and Mysuru divisions separated to form the South Western Railway. Ernakulam, Thrissur electrified.
 2003: Southern railways started operating trains from Anna Nagar west railway station and inaugurated that railway station.
 2004: Flying train of MRTS started service from Mylapore to Thiruvanmiyur in Chennai .
 2005: The Nilgiri Mountain train declared as one of the UNESCO World Heritage site.
 2006: Villupuram - Mayiladuthurai (main line) gauge conversions started.
 14 November 2006: Salem division was formed.
 01-05-2007 - Rail services on Kollam-Punalur section of the Kollam–Sengottai branch line withdrawned for gauge conversion works.
 2007: First movement on Pamban bridge after broad gauge conversion.
 2007: train service up to Anna Nagar discontinued.
 19-11-2007 MRTS train services extended up to velacherry.
 2008: Virudhunagar - Manamadurai gauge conversion started.
 10-12-2008 : Pollachi - Palghat Gauge conversion started
 2009: Dindigul - Pollachi - Podanur Gauge Conversion started
 2010 - Kollam-Thiruvananthapuram broad gauge line electrified
 2010: Vizhupuram - Mayiladuthurai (main line) services started.
 01-12-2013 Inauguration of Palakkad MEMU Shed
 10-05-2010 - Kollam-Punalur broad gauge section thrown open for services
 2011: Sengottai - Punalur gauge conversion began.
 2011: Madurai - Bodinayakkanur gauge conversion began.
 19-03-2012 - First MEMU service on Kollam-Ernakulam route flagged off
 2012: Thiruvarur - Pattukottai - karaikudi gauge conversion began.
 2012: Dindugal - palani train service starts
 14-07-2012 Virudhunagar - Manamadurai BG line opened.
 31-11-2012 - First MEMU service on Kollam-Kanyakumari route flagged off
 2013:  Inauguration of Karur - Salem line. 
 01-12-2013 Inauguration of Kollam MEMU Shed
 09-01-2015: Palani - Pollachi train service starts
 16-11-2015: Pollachi - Palghat train service starts
 2016:  Electric traction between Shoranur - Cheruvathur completed
 31-03-2018 - The entire Kollam–Sengottai line thrown open for passenger train services.
 2018: Doubling of railway line completed till Madurai from Chennai(chord line).
 2019: Thiruvarur - pattukottai - Karaikudi gauge Conversion ends and track opened for traffic.
 22-01-2020 - Madurai Junction to Usilampatti Stretch on the Madurai to Bodinayakkanur Railway line completed and opened for traffic
22-03-2020 - Railways ceased its passenger operations all over india for a long time due to corona virus lock down world wide(declared by W.H.O), though some special trains operated nearly after 6 months (except sharmik special trains for transporting migrant workers all around the nation during national lock down).
29-09-2020 - Singaperumal koil to Guduvancherry stretch on the Tambaram to Chengalpattu 3rd line opened for traffic
11-11-2020 - Mayiladuthurai to Thanjavur Main line electrified. By this the entire main line got electrified.
12-11-2020 - Kadambur to Gangai kondan and Vanchi Maniyachchi to Tataparai doubling completed and opened for traffic (chord line)
16-12-2020 - Usilambatti to Andipatti section open es for traffic on the Madurai Bodinayakkanur railway line.
20-01-2021 - Walajaroad Junction to Ranipettai Railway line opened for traffic(goods traffic only).
15-02-2021 - Chennai beach to Athipattu 4th line works completed and opened for traffic.

References

External links
 Southern Railway official website

Southern Railway zone
S
History of rail transport in India